San Pedro Cahro or San Pedro is a town located in North-western part of the state of Michoacan, Mexico. The town is located 15 minutes away from Lake Chapala and 170 kilometers from the state capital, Morelia. San Pedro Cahro is also known as Venustiano Carranza, and is located at 20°06' north latitude, 102° west longitude, with an elevation of 1,500 meters above sea level.

Populated places in Michoacán